Nicholas Anthony Christopher Candy (born 23 January 1973) and Christian Peter Candy (born 31 July 1974) are British luxury property developers. The brothers were estimated to share a joint net worth of £1.5 billion in the Estates Gazette rich list 2010, placing them at position 52 in the list of the richest property developers in the United Kingdom.

Early life and education
Born in London to a Greek-Cypriot mother and English father, the brothers were educated at Priory Preparatory School and Epsom College in Surrey. Christian was later studying for a business management degree at King's College London but did not graduate. Nick graduated from University of Reading with a degree in Human Geography.

Career
In 1995, they bought their first property, a one-bedroom flat in Redcliffe Square, Earl's Court, London. Using a £6,000 loan from their grandmother, the brothers renovated the £122,000 apartment while living in it. Eighteen months later they sold it for £172,000, making a £50,000 profit.

In their spare time between 1995 and 1999, the brothers began renovating flats and working their way up the property ladder. Eventually they were able to give up their day jobs where Nick worked in advertising for J. Walter Thompson and Christian for investment bank Merrill Lynch and established Candy & Candy in 1999, of which Nick is CEO. Nicholas and Christian, who did collaborate on the prestigious One Hyde Park scheme in London, operate separate independent businesses and have done for a number of years. In June 2018, Candy & Candy was renamed Candy Property in order to reinforce Nick Candy's sole ownership of the business and to align with his wider portfolio of companies. Some of their more high-profile developments, however, have been in London.

In 2016 and 2017 they were involved in high-profile litigation in the High Court in London which put their reputations on the line.  Mark Holyoake claimed in the High Court action that the Candy Brothers had used threats against him and his family to extort total repayments of £37m against a £12m loan. Although they were cleared of extortion, Mr Justice Nugee said in his judgment "the protagonists...have been willing to lie when they consider their commercial interests justify them doing so". Mr Justice Nugee went on to say "he had found none of Mr Holyoake's claims to be true, and that there had been no undue duress, influence, intimidation or unlawful interference with economic interests." In June 2018, following another application by Mr. Holyoake, the Court of Appeal rejected Mark Holyoake's bid challenging the high-profile high court ruling in December 2017 (above). Lord Justice David Richards concluded that Mr Holyoake's arguments had "no real prospect of success" meaning Mr Justice Nugee's original decision in 2017 was affirmed.

In recent years Nick Candy has diversified his interests outside of real estate and developed a portfolio of global investments (often in high tech, leading edge technology) through his private investment fund Candy Ventures. Candy Ventures, alongside Qualcomm Ventures was reported to have led a $37 million funding round for a leading augmented reality and computer vision company.  Candy Ventures acquired the intellectual property assets of leading augmented reality start-up Blippar in January 2019.

The website for Candy Ventures lists 18 investments within the companies portfolio, including Blippar, UK fashion house Ralph & Russo and data processing company Hanzo Archives.  Nick Candy is currently in dispute with Ralph & Russo, which filed for bankruptcy in March 2018, in the UK High Court over a disagreement over the terms of a £17 million loan given by Candy Ventures to the company.

Candy Ventures acquired a stake in Blippar and another tech start-up, Crowdmix, after both companies were placed into administration. The takeovers were both facilitated by Paul Appleton, who worked as the administrator for the two companies and was appointed administrator in the Ralph & Russo bankruptcy. Their portfolio includes mining investments in the Runruno gold mine in the Philippines, which has faced opposition from human rights groups after the demolition of local communities in 2012, which caused injuries to six local people. The development has also been blamed for causing landslides leading to deaths in the area. On 28 May 2022, The Times reported that Candy Ventures is considering a bid to buy The Hut Group, though journalist Oliver Shah was sceptical, pointing to "a series of disastrous investments in tech start-ups" and "no record of big acquisitions". However, on 15 June 2022, Bloomberg reported that Candy Ventures had pulled out of the bidding process for The Hut Group.

On 9 March 2022, Nick Candy, a boyhood fan, confirmed he was planning a consortium bid to take over Chelsea Football Club after owner Roman Abramovich put the club up for sale following Russia's invasion of Ukraine. The sale process was halted the following day after Abramovich's assets, including the club, were frozen to stop him making money from Chelsea, but the UK government was open to considering a variation to its sanctions licence to allow a sale so long as Abramovich received no funds. On 25 March 2022, The Athletic reported that Candy's bid to acquire Chelsea had failed, despite support from South Korean firms Hana Financial and C&P Sports Group.

In July 2022, his Luxembourg-registered investment vehicle, Candy Ventures SARL, sued Aaqua BV and its major shareholder, Robert Bonnier, for an alleged fraud. He claimed that Bonnier misled him about Aaqua, a false claim that Apple and LVMH are interested to invest in Aaqua, so requested to the court to froze Bonnier's assets and nullify the swap of his shares in Audioboom Group PLC, a podcast platform, with Aaqua. Later, the High Court issued a freezing order against Bonnier, but ordered that Candy Ventures had to obtain a £10 million bank guarantee to maintain the freezing order. In August 2022, the freezing orders were discharged. On 7 September 2022, Bonnier demanded £150 million in damages from Candy for falsely obtained freezing orders that turned his technology company into a credit risk.

Notable development projects

One Hyde Park (2004)

In 2004, the brothers sought an investment partner to help them buy the site of Bowater House in Knightsbridge, with plans to demolish it and construct 86 luxury apartments.

After setting up a joint venture with Waterknights – a private company owned by the Prime Minister of Qatar – they purchased the site from Land Securities in 2005 for £150m. One Hyde Park was also financed by a £1.15 billion development loan from the German bank, Eurohypo, a successor to the defunct Dresdner Bank, which was led by Matthias Warnig, a long-term associate of Russian President Vladimir Putin.

They then hired the architect Richard Rogers to design the exterior, and used their own Candy & Candy to handle interior design. One Hyde Park: The Residences of Mandarin Oriental, London, was constructed in four years after obtaining planning permission in 2006, with the finished development housing three commercial units: Rolex, McLaren Automotive and Abu Dhabi Islamic Bank. Despite its name, the building's address is located at 68-114 Knightsbridge, London. In 2015, The Guardian obtained a leaked recording of a 2010 promotional video for One Hyde Park, which features Richard Rogers, Nick Candy and Christian Candy, and Stephen Smith, a tax advisor for the Candy Brothers, who demanded changes to the video to "improve the tax profile" to avoid an enquiry by Her Majesty's Revenue & Customs, which at the time was led by Ian Barlow, a former director of a Candy brothers company in the British Virgin Islands.

The One Hyde Park development officially launched in January 2011 and had a profound effect on the global real estate market, breaking a number of industry records as the most expensive residential development in the world. It was reported that the penthouse apartments alone fetched some of the highest prices on record. Since the development opened, apartments at the complex have been purchased by the superrich, including Viktor Kharitonin, a Russian billionaire and business partner of Roman Abramovich, Ukrainian oligarch Rinat Akhmetov, who bought a triplex penthouse in 2010 for £136 million, Anar Aitzhanova, a Kazakh singer whose husband was shot dead in 2004, and Ekaterina Fedun, the daughter of Russian billionaire and Lukoil shareholder Leonid Fedun. Other owners of flats in the bloc include Temur Akhmedov, the son of sanctioned Russian-Azeri oligarch Farkhad Akhmedov, whose $460 million superyacht is now frozen in Germany due to EU sanctions following Russia's invasion of Ukraine in February 2022. On 18 June 2022, The Telegraph reported that Alexander Ponomarenko, a sanctioned Russian oligarch accused of purchasing a palace on behalf of President Vladimir Putin, is the owner of an apartment at One Hyde Park valued at £60 million.

In October 2018, it was reported that Nick Candy refinanced his penthouse at One Hyde Park with an £80 million mortgage from Credit Suisse in order to pursue rental opportunities. The property is reportedly valued at £160 million.

In April 2021, Bloomberg reported that Nick had placed his penthouse on the market for £175 million. In August 2020, Nick also announced that his yacht, the Eleven Eleven was up for sale for €59.5 million.

NoHo Square (2006)

In 2006, the site of the former Middlesex Hospital was purchased for £175m by Project Abbey (Guernsey) Holdings Ltd – an investment consortium which included Kaupthing Bank, the now defunct Icelandic bank, and was led by the Candy's CPC Group. In February 2007, the brothers applied to Westminster City Council for planning permission to redevelop the 1.2 hectare (3 acre) site into a mixed use development of several hundred new residential units and office space. The plans were met with strong criticism from local residents over the Candy's choice of NoHo Square as the name for the new development.

Planning permission for NoHo Square was granted in November 2007; however, the completion of demolition of the hospital in 2008 coincided with the collapse of Kaupthing as a result of the 2007-2008 global financial crisis. Kaupthing was the largest shareholder in the Guernsey-based consortium which bought the Middlesex site from University College Hospital in 2006, and with the bank in administration, the NoHo Square development stalled. As a result of CPC Group being partners with Kaupthing in another property development over in the US, the Candy brothers were able to transfer their equity stake in NoHo Square to the bank and in exchange take full control of the US development.

Chelsea Barracks (2007)

In April 2007, the Candy brothers acquired the Chelsea Barracks in a joint venture with Qatari Diar, part of the Qatar government's investment arm. In what is believed to be Britain's costliest residential property deal, the Candy brothers and the Qatari government have bought the 12.8-acre site from the Ministry of Defence for £959m.

In 2010, Candy's CPC Group brought an £81 million lawsuit against the Qatar Diar after the latter pulled out of the project, which was later settled out of court. Qatari Diar's decision to abandon the project came after pressure from Prince Charles, who criticised the plans and Qatar's Prime Minister and Chairman of Qatari Diar, Sheikh Hamad bin Jassim bin Jaber Al-Thani, calling the plans "brutish".

Beverly Hills 9900 Wilshire development (2008)
In April 2007, the Candy brothers purchased – through CPC Group – an eight-acre site in Beverly Hills, California, known as 9900 Wilshire, with their equity partners Kaupthing for a reported £250m.

CPC Group hired architect Richard Meier to design a condominium and retail complex in place of the former Robinsons-May department store.  Victor Bardack of the Beverly Hills North Homeowners Association said: "To put two huge projects on the already-impacted intersection of Santa Monica and Wilshire boulevards is grossly detrimental to the community,[...] It'll be gridlock forever." The controversy stemmed from the Sheikh being part owner of a Middle Eastern newspaper that has been accused of being anti-Semitic and anti-American.

CPC Group served a written notice of default on Kaupthing shortly after. In the same month, the situation was made worse when the acquisition loan to the project from Credit Suisse became past due, and, additionally, it became increasingly difficult to get financing on the 250 condominiums that the original plans catered for. This was due to the collapse of the property market and banks pulling their funding. It was later reported that CPC Group – after negotiating full control of the development from Kaupthing – defaulted on a US$365.5 million bank loan.

Gordon House
Christian agreed to purchase Gordon House from the Royal Hospital Chelsea in 2012. He exchanged contracts, consisting of two lease agreements for £20 million and £48 million. Christian began elaborate subterranean building works, including a 60 ft swimming pool and a cinema. Even though he had not completed on the purchase, the start of the works triggered a rule that the purchase had been "substantially performed", so he had to pay the SDLT levy. He decided not to move in, despite having paid £27.4 million of the price, and gave it to Nick, who finished the works and completed on the purchase — at which point he became liable to pay the tax again.

Personal life
Christian married Emily Crompton, socialite and former nightclub hostess, in a lavish ceremony in 2010. They had twins in 2013, Isabella Monaco Evanthia and Cayman Charles Wolf. They lived between UK and Monaco.

On 29 September 2012, Nick married the Australian-British actress-musician-TV presenter Holly Valance in Beverly Hills, California, US. In November 2013 in London, they had their first child, a daughter, Luka Violet Toni. Their second daughter, Nova Skye Coco, was born in September 2017. On 8 April 2022, Candy and Valance were pictured with former US President Donald Trump and British politician Nigel Farage at Trump's Mar-a-Lago resort, with a tweet by Farage indicating that the group had dinner together. A report in The Times on 28 May 2022 indicated that Candy is also friends with comedians Jimmy Carr and David Walliams, referring to Candy as "any Olympic level name dropper".

In December 2021, The Daily Mirror published a photograph revealing that Nick attended a party with the then Conservative London mayoral candidate Shaun Bailey on 14 December 2020, which would have broken coronavirus restrictions at the time. The publication of the photograph in December 2021 followed reporting by The Times in March 2021, which named Nick as the leader of fundraising for Shaun Bailey's London mayoral campaign. In June 2020, The Guardian also reported that Candy had donated £100,000 to the Conservative Party in March 2020.

References

External links
CPC Group
Candy & Candy Design

Living people
Business duos
British real estate businesspeople
Place of birth missing (living people)
Year of birth missing (living people)
English people of Greek Cypriot descent
People educated at Epsom College
English businesspeople
People from Banstead